Jarina Nunatak is a nunatak lying  west-northwest of the main summit of Trinity Nunatak in the stream of the Mawson Glacier, Antarctica. It was named by the Advisory Committee on Antarctic Names in 1964 for Lieutenant Commander Michael Jarina, a pilot with U.S. Navy Squadron VX-6 in 1962.

References

Nunataks of Victoria Land
Scott Coast